Myint Zaw is a Burmese journalist and activist.

He was awarded the 2015 Goldman Environment Prize for Asia, for bringing forward environmental and social impacts from the planned Myitsone Dam, a large Irrawaddy River dam project that is estimated to have impacts on millions of people, and displacing about 18,000 inhabitants. In 2010, he and others issued the picture album The Sketch of a River: The Ayeyarwady, and organized several exhibitions of photographs from the Irrawaddy.

References

External links
Myint Zaw: 2015 Goldman Prize Recipient, Asia

Year of birth missing (living people)
Living people
Burmese journalists
Burmese activists
Asian environmentalists
Goldman Environmental Prize awardees